Poonjar is a small Indian town located on the eastern side of Kottayam district in Kerala state, India. Before the independence of India, Poonjar had been the part of Travancore princely state.Erattupetta, Teekoy, bharananganam, and vagamon are the nearest towns and villages of Poonjar.Taluk headquarters,pala is 18 kilometres away from poonjar and kanjirapally is 22.6 kilometres away from poonjar

History
Poonjar is a place of historic importance, situated on the north-eastern part of Kottayam district. Poonjar, a town at the foothills of Western Ghats, was the capital of Poonjar Kingdom.

Poonjar dynasty

The Poonjar dynasty originated from the Pandyan Kings of the Sangam Age. The founder of the dynasty, Manavikrama Kulashekhara Perumal, was a Pandyan king whose mother was a Chera princess. In 1152 AD, he shifted from Madurai due to the incessant civil wars in Tamil Country. The Raja carried one of the three idols of Meenakshi, their "Kula Devatha", which was used in the annual car festival at the famed Madurai Meenakshi Temple. It was established as a "pratishta" in the Meenakshi temple where it currently sits, on the banks of the Meenachil River.

Manavikram Raja
History documents that Manavikraman Raja procured the land from the Thekkancoor Rajas, which is now part of Kottayam, Pathanamthitta and Idukki districts of Kerala and added it to his domain in Tamil country. He established political connections in present day Kerala by giving his daughter in marriage to the then Edapally Raja. Kochi was not yet an established kingdom. During the height of its glory in the 17th and 18th century AD, the Poonjar dynasty had suzerainty over the present day Idukki and Kottayam districts, parts of Ernakulam and Pathanamthitta districts in Kerala. They also held sway over the districts of Ramnad and parts of Madurai in Tamil Nadu.

Palani Hills
The Palani hills were also part of the Poonjar kingdom. In July 1877, among other leases, Kerala Varma Raja, then chief of the royal house leased  for 99 years, to a British planter named Thomas Munro. This is the famous Kannan Devan Hill Produce Company (KDHP) lease. The area under the current Mullaperiyar Dam was part of their jurisdiction. Their neighbour to the south, Travancore, whose territorial boundary was Kottarakara, did not dispute the actual control until 1889. Travancore finally established their suzerainty by royal proclamation on 24 September 1899, backed by the British.

Finlays company
The Kannan Devan lease, not ownership, was passed on to Finlays in the 1930s, and subsequently taken over by TATA Tea Ltd in the 1950s. The lease has since expired and the land ownership is in dispute.

The main revenue for the Poonjar Kingdom was hill and forest produce, and Erattupetta was the commercial center.

Ancient palace
The ancient palace and temples dedicated to Sree Dharma Shastha and Meenakshi are located on the banks of the Meenachil River. Raghubir Singh, the famed National Geographic photographer, has published photographs of this temple, nestled in the foothills of the high ranges of Kerala, in National Geographic.

Education
The S.M.V. High School, dedicated to the memory of the then Maharaja Sri Moolam Tirunal of Travancore dynasty, was founded in 1913 and was the only school in the region for decades and luminaries of all political, bureaucratic, academic, literary and religious hues who have played formative roles in modern Kerala have passed through its gates. Some of the notable names among its alumni are Col. GV Raja, Sri PR Rama Varma Raja (Alacode Raja), Sri PK Vasudevan Nair (former Chief Minister of Kerala), Sri TA Thomman (former Minister of Kerala), Sri CP Ramakrishna Pillai IAS (former Secretary, Govt of Kerala), Sri R Ramachandran Nair IAS (former Chief Secretary, Govt of Kerala), Sri KJ Mathew IAS (former Chief Secretary, Govt of Kerala, etc. The school, as well as five temples, are currently managed by a family trust of the Palace. Colonel Goda Varma Raja (G.V. Raja), the consort of the Maharani of erstwhile Travancore, Karthika Thirunal Lakshmi Bayi, and brother-in-law of Maharaja Sri Chitra Tirunal, was a member of this family. His elder brother was P. R. Rama Varma Raja, who, after a difference of opinion with C. P. Ramaswami Iyer, left Travancore in the late 1930s, and purchased  of land in Alakode, Taliparamba taluk of Kannur district. He was often referred to as the Alakode Raja.

A.T.M.Library(Avittam Thirunal Memorial Library)
Another landmark institution in Poonjar is the ATM library. This library, named after Avittam Thirunal, the deceased crown Prince of Travancore and eldest son of Col GV Raja, was established in the year 2003. This "A" class library has played an important role in shaping many generations of Poonjar.

Churches
Poonjar is also home to some of the oldest churches like the  St. Mary's church adivaram, St Joseph's church Maniamkunnu, etc. Today there are tens of churches in Poonjar.

Transportation
Poonjar is well connected to the other parts of the state by frequent state transport and private bus services. Poonjar is very near to the well-known tourist spots like Poonjar Palace, Vagamon, Kolahalamedu, Ilaveezha Poonchira etc. The popular Christian pilgrim centre Bharananganam and Aruvithura is also very near to Poonjar. The nearest railway station is Ettumanoor (35 km) and airport is Cochin (80 km).
Nearest places are Parathanam 16km, Kunnonni, Peringulam, Adivaram, Pathampuzha, Panachikappara, Erattupetta

Geography
Geographically Poonjar is divided into Poonjar Thekkekara, Poonjar Vadakkekkara and Poonjar Nadubhagam villages. Two main tributaries of Meenachil river originate in Poonjar hills and join at Erattupetta. There are numerous waterfalls and rivulets in the hills. Kunnonny, Adivaram, Pathambuzha, Kaippally are some of the nearest villages. Muthukora hills which is situated in poonjar called the meeshappulimala of kottayam  lies 2400 feet above sea-level. Kottathavalam waterfalls also in poonjar.

Education
Sree Moola vilasam (SMV) Higher Secondary School and St. Antony's Higher Secondary School are the main higher secondary schools in Poonjar.

In the year 2000, an Engineering College managed by the Institute of Human Resource Development (IHRD) was constructed near the Poonjar bus stand. The college was given the name College of Engineering, Poonjar. Now, the place near bus stand is occupied for Model Polytechnic College Poonjar. In the year 2003, a separate building was constructed for the college at Payyanithotam (4 km from Poonjar) in order to avoid the disturbances caused during peak hours at the bus stand.

College of Engineering, Poonjar is established by the Institute of Human Resources Development (IHRD), A Government of Kerala Undertaking. IHRD is a pioneer educational organisation supported by Kerala Government, in the fields of Electronics and Computer Science.College of Engineering, Poonjar started its functioning in the academic year 2000-2001. The College is affiliated to the prestigious Cochin University of Science and Technology (CUSAT).

Politics
Poonjar is one of the 140 legislative assembly constituencies of Kerala state. Poonjar's assembly constituency is part of Pathanamthitta (Lok Sabha constituency). Previously it was part of Muvattupuzha (Lok Sabha constituency). The major political parties of Poonjar are Kerala Congress (M), Indian National Congress, CPI (M) and CPI.

Eminent political leaders of the past include A. J. John, Anaparambil (former Chief Minister of Travancore-Cochin) and K. M. George (former Minister and the founder of Kerala Congress).

The present political leaders of Kerala who are from Poonjar are N. M. Joseph (former minister and State President of Janathadal (S)) and P. C. George.

References

Villages in Kottayam district